Jean Couzy (9 July 1923 – 2 November 1958) was a French mountaineer. He studied aeronautical engineering at the École Polytechnique. At age 27, he was a member of Maurice Herzog's 1950 expedition to Annapurna. Prior to this, his usual climbing partner was Marcel Schatz, another member of the expedition. On the 1955 French Makalu expedition Couzy made the first ascent of Makalu with Lionel Terray on May 15, 1955.

In the Alps, Jean Couzy was the first to ascend the following routes:
 Aiguille de l'M near Chamonix, a classical Severe (D) route named "la Couzy"
 An Extremely Severe (ED) route on the north-west face of the Olan.
 The Couzy route on the North Face of the Cima Ovest, Dolomites.

On November 2, 1958, he was hit on the head by a rock fall in the southern face of crête des Bergers (southern rim of the Bure plateau) in the Dévoluy Mountains. He is buried in Montmaur cemetery, at the foot of the mountain where his accident occurred.

References

External links
http://www.britannica.com/EBchecked/topic/141002/Jean-Couzy

French mountain climbers
People from Nérac
1932 births
1958 deaths
Mountaineering deaths
Sportspeople from Lot-et-Garonne
Sport deaths in France
École Polytechnique alumni
20th-century French people